The following is a list of countries by exports of refined petroleum, including gasoline. Data is for 2012, in millions of United States dollars, as reported by The Observatory of Economic Complexity. Currently the top 21 countries are listed.

References
atlas.media.mit.edu - Observatory of Economic complexity - Countries that export Refined Petroleum (2012)

Refined petroleum
Refined petroleum exports
Exports, refined
Petroleum economics